Mikulicze  (Mykulychi) is a village in the administrative district of Gmina Milejczyce, within Siemiatycze County, Podlaskie Voivodeship, in north-eastern Poland. Known birthplace of famous Polish war hero Władysław Grydziuszko.

References

Villages in Siemiatycze County